Solutions of the Einstein field equations are metrics of spacetimes that result from solving the Einstein field equations (EFE) of general relativity. Solving the field equations gives a Lorentz manifold. Solutions are broadly classed as exact or non-exact.

The Einstein field equations are

The Einstein field equations relate the Einstein tensor to the stress–energy tensor, which represents the distribution of energy, momentum and stress in the spacetime manifold. The Einstein tensor is built up from the metric tensor and its partial derivatives; thus, given the stress–energy tensor, the Einstein field equations are a system of ten partial differential equations in which the metric tensor can be solved for.
Where appropriate, this article will use the abstract index notation.

Solving the equations
It is important to realize that the Einstein field equations alone are not enough to determine the evolution of a gravitational system in many cases. They depend on the stress–energy tensor, which depends on the dynamics of matter and energy (such as trajectories of moving particles), which in turn depends on the gravitational field. If one is only interested in the weak field limit of the theory, the dynamics of matter can be computed using special relativity methods and/or Newtonian laws of gravity and then the resulting stress–energy tensor can be plugged into the Einstein field equations. But if the exact solution is required or a solution describing strong fields, the evolution of the metric and the stress–energy tensor must be solved for together.

To obtain solutions, the relevant equations are the above quoted EFE (in either form) plus the continuity equation (to determine evolution of the stress–energy tensor):

This is clearly not enough, as there are only 14 equations (10 from the field equations and 4 from the continuity equation) for 20 unknowns (10 metric components and 10 stress–energy tensor components). Equations of state are missing. In the most general case, it's easy to see that at least 6 more equations are required, possibly more if there are internal degrees of freedom (such as temperature) which may vary throughout spacetime.

In practice, it is usually possible to simplify the problem by replacing the full set of equations of state with a simple approximation. Some common approximations are:

 Vacuum:

 Perfect fluid:
 where 

 Non-interacting dust ( a special case of perfect fluid ):

For a perfect fluid, another equation of state relating density  and pressure  must be added. This equation will often depend on temperature, so a heat transfer equation is required or the postulate that heat transfer can be neglected.

Next, notice that only 10 of the original 14 equations are independent, because the continuity equation  is a consequence of Einstein's equations. This reflects the fact that the system is gauge invariant (in general, absent some symmetry, any choice of a curvilinear coordinate net on the same system would correspond to a numerically different solution.) A "gauge fixing" is needed, i.e. we need to impose 4 (arbitrary) constraints on the coordinate system in order to obtain unequivocal results.  These constraints are known as coordinate conditions.

A popular choice of gauge is the so-called "De Donder gauge", also known as the harmonic condition or harmonic gauge

In numerical relativity, the preferred gauge is the so-called "3+1 decomposition", based on the ADM formalism. In this decomposition, metric is written in the form
, where 

Once equations of state are chosen and the gauge is fixed, the complete set of equations can be solved. Unfortunately, even in the simplest case of gravitational field in the vacuum (vanishing stress–energy tensor), the problem is too complex to be exactly solvable. To get physical results, we can either turn to numerical methods, try to find exact solutions by imposing symmetries, or try middle-ground approaches such as perturbation methods or linear approximations of the Einstein tensor.

Exact solutions

Exact solutions are Lorentz metrics that are conformable to a physically realistic stress–energy tensor and which are obtained by solving the EFE exactly in closed form.

External reference
Scholarpedia article on the subject written by Malcolm MacCallum

Non-exact solutions

The solutions that are not exact are called non-exact solutions. Such solutions mainly arise due to the difficulty of solving the EFE in closed form and often take the form of approximations to ideal systems. Many non-exact solutions may be devoid of physical content, but serve as useful counterexamples to theoretical conjectures.

Al Momin argues that Kurt Gödel's solution to these equations do not describe our universe and are therefore approximations.

Applications

There are practical as well as theoretical reasons for studying solutions of the Einstein field equations.

From a purely mathematical viewpoint, it is interesting to know the set of solutions of the Einstein field equations. Some of these solutions are parametrised by one or more parameters.

See also

Ricci calculus
Albert Einstein

References

 
 
 

General relativity
Albert Einstein